Zach Hadel (born March 4, 1993), known by his pseudonym psychicpebbles, is an American animator, voice actor, Internet personality, writer, director, and storyboard artist. He and Michael Cusack are co-creators of the Adult Swim animated series Smiling Friends. He is also known for his Internet animations and for being a co-host of Let's Play web series OneyPlays.

Career
Hadel grew up in Kansas and began his animation career by uploading Adobe Flash animations to Newgrounds, later transitioning to YouTube. He enrolled in college to learn graphic design, but dropped out. A self-taught animator, Hadel had stated that shows such as SpongeBob SquarePants, The Simpsons and South Park had inspired his animation style. Videos of his became popular online, such as his animated video about the "arrow in the knee" meme from The Elder Scrolls V: Skyrim which went viral in 2011. Along with fellow Newgrounds animator Chris O'Neill, Hadel created the popular web cartoon series Hellbenders, which was picked up for a pilot by Adult Swim, but ultimately not pursued. Hadel also collaborated with O'Neill to make an animated short video parodying the Kony 2012 documentary; the video went viral, receiving over 1.7 million views within its first weekend. Hadel was also a member of SleepyCabin, a comedy and discussion podcast hosted by former Newgrounds animators. , his YouTube channel psychicpebbles has 1.5 million subscribers and 208.4 million views.

Hadel animated a segment of Seth Rogen's Hilarity for Charity with Justin Roiland, co-creator of Rick and Morty. Roiland later stated the animation was the one instance of a joke that went too far. Hadel and Roiland also appeared alongside animator Alex Hirsch on h3h3's livestream podcast for charity where they raised over $100,000 for California wildlife relief.

Hadel hosted the podcast Schmucks from 2017 to 2019, where he interviewed fellow entertainers such as Michael Stevens, Finn Wolfhard, Jon Jafari, and Ethan Klein.

In 2018, Hadel storyboarded for SpongeBob SquarePants for the season 11 episode "The Grill is Gone".

On April 1, 2020, Cartoon Network's late-night Adult Swim block premiered the pilot episode of Hadel and Michael Cusack's animated adult television series, Smiling Friends. The series follows two employees, Pim and Charlie, of a private company missioned to make people smile. The series premiered with a full season marathon on January 9, 2022, and debuted on HBO Max on February 9.

Filmography

Film

Television

Web

Video games 

Sourced from Hadel's IMDb page and YouTube channel.

Notes

References

External links
 psychicpebbles
 
 thepyschicpebble, Archived from the original on June 15, 2010

1993 births
Living people
American male voice actors
American YouTubers
Comedy YouTubers
Newgrounds people
Web series producers
YouTube animators
YouTube channels launched in 2009
American animators
American surrealist artists
Flash artists